Castorena is a surname. Notable people with the surname include:

 Daniel Gutiérrez Castorena (born 1954), Mexican politician
 José Arnulfo Castorena (born 1978), Mexican Paralympic swimmer

See also
 Juan Ignacio María de Castorena Ursúa y Goyeneche

Surnames of Mexican origin